Krivaj can refer to one of the following villages:

 Krivaj, Požega-Slavonia County
 Krivaj, Sisak-Moslavina County